The 12th Pan American Games were held in Mar del Plata, Argentina from March 11 to March 26, 1995.

Medals

Gold

Men's 800 metres: José Luiz Barbosa
Men's 1500 metres: Joaquim Cruz
Men's 3000 m Steeplechase: Wander Moura
Men's 400 m Hurdles: Eronilde de Araújo
Women's 10,000 metres: Carmem de Oliveira

Silver

Men's 5000 metres: Wander Moura
Men's 10,000 metres: Valdenor dos Santos
Men's 400 m Hurdles: Everson Teixeira
Women's 800 metres: Luciana Mendes

Bronze

Men's 100 metres: André da Silva
Men's 10,000 metres: Ronaldo da Costa
Men's Marathon: Luiz da Silva

Group All-Around (Rhythmic Gymnastics):

Results by event

See also
Brazil at the 1996 Summer Olympics

References
 Official website of the Brazilian Olympic Committee

Nations at the 1995 Pan American Games
Pan American Games
1995